Teresa's Tattoo (also known as Natural Selection) is a 1994 American action comedy-crime film directed by Julie Cypher. The film stars C. Thomas Howell, Nancy McKeon, Lou Diamond Phillips, Melissa Etheridge, who also performed songs for the film, Casey Siemaszko, Adrienne Shelly, and Majel Barrett. It was filmed in Los Angeles, California, USA.

Teresa's Tattoo was produced by CineTel Films, Trimark Pictures, and Yankee Entertainment Group Inc. It was distributed by Trimark Pictures.

Plot
The film starts with Gloria (Adrienne Shelly), who is being held hostage, bothering her captors in charge of watching her, Mooney (Anthony Clark) and Titus (Matt Adler), by changing the channel the two were watching on television and jumping in front of the TV. Titus then scolds and takes the remote from Gloria and suggests she should go take a swim in the pool outside which she subsequently obliges. While playing in the pool, Gloria hauls a trampoline near the edge of the pool and begins to jump on it before slipping and falling in the pool. The film then cuts to a university where Teresa Brigger (also Adrienne Shelly), a mathematician grad student that bears an uncanny resemblance to Gloria, is talking to her friend Bruno, (Joe Pantoliano) about her plans for the upcoming spring break. She plans on not celebrating the coming holiday and wants to continue studying math. The film cuts back to the pool where Carl (C. Thomas Howell), Titus and Mooney's boss, shows up to find their hostage who is supposed to be exchanged later in a ransom deal with Gloria's half-witted brother, Michael (Casey Siemaszko) and his associate, Wheeler (Lou Diamond Phillips) for the earrings she is wearing that is secretly holograph plans to a confidential NASA space program, dead after drowning in the pool. The trio then decide to search for a girl that looks like the deceased Gloria so they can complete the deal. Teresa and Bruno then go to a gathering where she encounters Bruno's friend and her ex love interest, Rick (Jonathan Silverman).

Cast

Home media
The film was released on VHS in the U.S. by Lionsgate Home Entertainment.

Soundtrack
"2001" – Written and Performed by Melissa Etheridge
"I Really Must Be Going" – Written and Performed by Melissa Etheridge
"All American Girl" – Written and Performed by Melissa Etheridge
"Do It For The Rush" – Written and Performed by Melissa Etheridge
"Save Myself" – Written by Melissa Etheridge; Performed by Mare Winningham
"No Strings Attached" – Written by Simone Lazer and Audrey Koz; Performed by Betty Ball
"When You're Near" – Written and Performed by David Adjian
"Pool Cue Music" – Written and Performed by Richard Friedman
"All Night Long" – Written by Mark Gast; Performed by Raging Storm
"Betrayal of Kings" – Written by Mark Gast; Performed by Salem's Wych
"Lover Lay Down" – Written and Performed by K.O.
"Alah" – Written and Performed by Andrew Kereazies
"I Feel You" – Written and Performed by Andrew Kereazies
"Silver Bullet" – Written by Leigh Lawson & Jack Marsh; Performed by Leigh Lawson
"Coming Down On Me" – Written by Leigh Lawson & Pete Sadony; Performed by Leigh Lawson

Production crew
Samuel Benedict (producer)
Lisa M. Hansen (producer)
Philip McKeon (producer)
Paul Hertzberg (executive producer)
Marc Rocco (executive producer)
 Georgie Huntington (associate producer)
 Catalaine Knell (co-producer)
 Donald C. McKeon (co-producer)
 Russell D. Markkowitz (line producer)

References

Citations

Sources

External links

1994 films
1990s crime drama films
CineTel Films films
1990s crime comedy films
American crime drama films
Trimark Pictures films
1994 comedy films
1994 drama films
Films about kidnapping
1990s English-language films
1990s American films
1995 directorial debut films